Scott Henderson (born 1954) s an American jazz fusion and blues guitarist.

Scott Henderson may also refer to:
Scott Henderson (alpine skier), Canadian skier
Scott Henderson (golfer) (born 1969), Scottish golfer

See also
Scoot Henderson (born 2004), American basketball player